Forest Whitaker is an American actor, producer and director.

Film

As actor

As producer

As director

Television

Video games

Music videos

References

External links
 

Male actor filmographies
Director filmographies
American filmographies